Desulfospira  is a Gram-negative and anaerobic bacteria genus from the family of Desulfobacteraceae.

References

Further reading 
 

Desulfobacterales
Bacteria genera
Monotypic bacteria genera